The 1972–73 FA Trophy was the fourth season of the FA Trophy.

Preliminary round

Ties

Replays

2nd replay

First qualifying round

Ties

Replays

2nd replay

Second qualifying round

Ties

Replays

Third qualifying round

Ties

Replays

1st round
The teams that given byes to this round are Stafford Rangers, Barrow, Telford United, Macclesfield Town, Hillingdon Borough, Wimbledon, Worcester City, Romford, Weymouth, Yeovil Town, Wigan Athletic, Bangor City, Mossley, Kidderminster Harriers, Bromsgrove Rovers, Burscough, Chelmsford City, Barnet, Grantham, Buxton, Burton Albion, Bedford Town, Dover, Scarborough, Matlock Town, Tamworth, Hastings United, Stourbridge, Dartford, South Liverpool, Chorley and Ilkeston Town.

Ties

Replays

2nd replay

2nd round

Ties

Replays

3rd round

Ties

Replays

4th round

Ties

Replay

2nd replay

Semi finals

Ties

Replay

Final

References

General
 Football Club History Database: FA Trophy 1972-73

Specific

1972–73 domestic association football cups
League
1972-73